Mouse Systems Corporation (MSC), formerly Rodent Associates, was founded in 1982 by Steve Kirsch. The company was responsible for bringing the mouse to the IBM PC for the first time.

History
Mouse Systems' optical mouse, wired to a Sun workstation and an Atari 400 running Missile Command, attracted many observers at the October, 1982 Mini/Micro '82 conference in Anaheim, attended by over  people—and won a "best new product" award.

In 1982, MSC acquired rights to PCPaint from Microtex Industries, the first mouse-driven image manipulation program for the IBM PC, written in assembly language by Doug Wolfgram. Mouse Systems wanted the software re-developed to look more like Apple's MacPaint so Wolfgram brought in co-developer John Bridges and together they re-wrote the program in C with an updated user interface. Millions of copies were shipped, primarily bundled with all their mice until the early 1990s.

KYE Systems, producer of the Genius brand of mice, acquired Mouse Systems in 1990.

Technical details

Like all early optical mice, their debut product relied on a special metallic and reflective mousepad printed with a square grid of grey and blue tracking lines: as the device moved over the pad, light emitted by an LED was reflected by the pad onto an array of sensors whose output was processed by an on-board controller, which in turn supplied the host computer with machine-readable tracking data via an RS-232 serial port. When connected to a regular RS-232 port, an external power supply was required. Some mice would derive their power supply from the keyboard connector on the motherboard and came with a pass-through connector to be inserted before the keyboard cable.

Early Sun workstations used MSC optical mice exclusively. The mouse was connected via a dedicated connector with power, obviating the need for a separate power supply for the mouse. Initial models came with large mousepads with well-spaced lines, while later models were smaller and used a much tighter grid.

See also
 Mouse Systems ProAgio

References

Further reading

External links
 

1990 mergers and acquisitions
American companies established in 1982
American companies disestablished in 1990
Computer companies established in 1982
Computer companies disestablished in 1990
Defunct computer companies of the United States
Defunct computer hardware companies